Sabina Matos (born February 13, 1974) is a Dominican-American politician serving as the 70th lieutenant governor of Rhode Island. Sabina Matos is the first Latina and Black Woman lieutenant governor and the first Dominican-American elected to state-wide office in the United States. A member of the Democratic Party, she previously represented Ward 15 in the Providence City Council and served as Council President.

Early life
Matos was born in Paraíso, Barahona, Dominican Republic in 1974. Her mother was a teacher and her father served as mayor of Paraíso. Matos emigrated  to the United States in April 1994, at the age of 20, with her parents and sister. She spoke no English when she went to the United States, and thought she would return to the Dominican Republic by the end of the year.

After briefly living in New York, Matos and her family settled with her uncle in the Olneyville neighborhood of Providence, Rhode Island. Matos graduated from Rhode Island College with a bachelor's degree in communications and public relations in 2001. She became a United States citizen in 2005.

Political career
Matos ran for the Ward 15 seat on the Providence City Council in the 2006 elections, losing the Democratic primary to long standing incumbent Josephine DiRuzzo. She challenged DiRuzzo again in 2010, and won. She was a 2014 Aspen Institute Rodel Fellow.

Matos became acting president of the council in May 2017 and served in the role until December 2017. She was elected president of the city council in January 2019. During the 2020 presidential election, she served as one of Rhode Island's four electors.

In 2021, after Gina Raimondo resigned as Governor of Rhode Island to become the United States Secretary of Commerce, and Lieutenant Governor Dan McKee succeeded her as Governor, Matos applied to become the next Lieutenant Governor of Rhode Island. On March 31, 2021, Governor McKee announced he would nominate Matos to be Lieutenant Governor. The confirmation process began in the Rhode Island Senate on April 8, and the judiciary committee approved her nomination unanimously, sending her nomination for confirmation by the full Senate. On April 9, she submitted her resignation from the Providence City Council, effective April 13. Matos was confirmed as lieutenant governor by the State Senate on April 13 by a vote of 34–0 and was sworn into office on April 14. She is the first member of an ethnic minority and the second woman to hold the position.

In the 2022 Democratic Primary, Sabina Matos defeated State Representative Deb Ruggiero and State Senator Cynthia Mendes winning with 47.1% of the vote. 

In the 2022 General election, Matos defeated Republican Aaron Guckian and Independent Ross McCurdy winning with 51.2% of the vote.

On March 13, 2023, Matos announced her candidacy for Rhode Island's 1st Congressional District.

Personal life
Matos resides in Providence with her husband, Patrick Ward and their children.

See also
List of female lieutenant governors in the United States
List of minority governors and lieutenant governors in the United States

References

External links

1974 births
2020 United States presidential electors
American politicians of Dominican Republic descent
Dominican Republic emigrants to the United States
Living people
Naturalized citizens of the United States
People from Barahona Province
Providence City Council members
Rhode Island College alumni
Rhode Island Democrats
Women city councillors in Rhode Island
Lieutenant Governors of Rhode Island
21st-century American women